The Pakistan Super League (PSL) is a professional Twenty20 cricket league contested by six teams representing six cities of Pakistan. The league was founded in 2015 with five teams by the Pakistan Cricket Board (PCB). Instead of operating as an association of independently owned teams, the league is a single entity in which each franchise is owned and controlled by investors.

Each team plays the group stage matches in a  double round robin format; the top four teams with the most points qualify for the playoffs, culminating in the final. The league is based in Lahore.

There have been eight seasons of the league. Islamabad United and Lahore Qalandars has won the title twice, making them the most successful teams. The current champions are Lahore Qalandars, who won the 2023 season. They became the first team to successfully defend their title after they won the 2022 season.

History

Establishment
In September 2015, the Pakistan Cricket Board officially announced the launch of the PSL. Former Pakistani national team captains Wasim Akram and Rameez Raja signed up to promote the PSL and become brand ambassadors of the league for three years.
After several years of planning and two previous failed attempts, the league officially began on 4 February 2016 in the United Arab Emirates where daughter of former Pakistani president, Asif Zardari, Bakhtawar Bhutto-Zardari, alongside Nahyan bin Mubarak Al Nahyan, inaugurated the opening ceremony. The first two seasons included five teams based on the capital cities of Pakistan's provinces and the Federal capital. In its first season the PSL had a higher percentage of international players. The league uses a draft system for player recruitment similar to that used in many North American professional sports leagues and as opposed to the auction system used in some other T20 leagues.

The PSL's official logo was launched on 20 September 2015 in a ceremony in Lahore, and was revealed by 3Di.The ceremony was attended by current and retired cricketers, as well as Pakistani celebrities.

The market value of PSL in 2017 was up to US$300 million according to Arif Habib, and has grown significantly in the years since.

Expansion
The possibility of adding a sixth team to the league in 2017, possibly in Azad Kashmir, was discussed, but rejected in May 2016. Sethi announced that there would be the sixth team in next season of PSL, a few days after the end of the 2017 PSL. Khyber Pakhtunkhwa Governor Iqbal Zafar Jhagra also announced that the PSL administration would be approached for the participation of a sixth team in the 2018 PSL. Hafiz Hafeezur Rehman, chief minister of Gilgit-Baltistan, also said to have the sixth team from Gilgit-Baltistan. The PCB short-listed five names for sixth team: Faisalabad, FATA, Hyderabad, Dera Murad Jamali and Multan.

The final name of the sixth team for PSL 2018 season was announced on 1 June 2017; Multan Sultans; owned by Schön Properties at $5.2 million annually. On 10 November 2018, PCB terminated franchise agreements with Schön Properties, resulting in a new owner being introduced. New owners decided to continue with the same name (Multan Sultans) for the franchise.

Profits
In the 2022 edition, which was held entirely in Pakistan, PCB chairman Ramiz Raja reported a 71 percent increase in the PSL's profit; each franchise received  in revenue before the season had started.

Format

The PSL is played in a double round-robin format. Every team plays each other twice and the top four advance to the Playoffs. The playoffs use the Page playoff system, like the Indian Premier League.

The league follows the rules and regulations dictated by the International Cricket Council, although it introduced DRS system in T20s which was later emulated by International Cricket Council as well. In the group stage, two points are awarded for a win, one for a no-result and none for a loss. In the event of tied scores after both teams have faced their quota of overs, a super over is used to determine the match winner. In the group stage teams are ranked on the following criteria:

 Higher number of points
 If equal, better run rate
 If equal, highest number of wins
 If equal, fewest losses
 If still equal, the results of head-to-head meeting

In any play-off match in which there is no result, a super over is used to determine the winner. If the super over is not possible or the result of the over is a tie, the team which finished in the highest league position at the end of the regular season is deemed the winner of the match.

Schedule
PSL has taken place in February and March of each year.  The only exception was the interruption due to COVID-19.  The PSL has taken place prior to Indian Premier League.  In 2025, PSL and IPL will overlap in timing.

Teams

According to a PCB press release, around 20 parties showed an interest in buying franchises for the league before the first season. On 18 October 2015 the Pakistan Cricket Board began accepting tenders for franchises with a deadline for bids of 15 November.

According to a statement by the PCB, bid winners would be granted the rights to a franchise for a term of ten years. Interested parties included the ARY Group, Omar Associates, Arif Habib Group, Haier, Mobilink as well as international groups including Leonine Global Sports and the Qatar Lubricants Company (QALCO).

In April 2017, PCB invited bids for the sixth team and the deadline set for the submission of both the financial and technical proposals was 30 May and as many as 40 national and international parties expressed an interest in buying the sixth franchise.

However, on 12 November 2018, its rights were terminated by PCB due to payment issues. PCB invited bids and resold the "6th team" to Ali Tareen consortium after successful bid with US$6.35 million for 7 years on 20 December 2018.

Notes

Results

Due to security reasons, the first season of the PSL was played entirely in the United Arab Emirates. The inaugural champions were Islamabad United, who defeated Quetta Gladiators in the final. Peshawar Zalmi were the 2017 PSL champions, beating Quetta Gladiators in Lahore on 5 March 2017. Islamabad United were the 2018 PSL champions, beating defending champions Peshawar Zalmi on 25 March 2018. Quetta Gladiators defeated Peshawar Zalmi to win their first title on 17 March 2019 in Karachi, in 2020 Karachi Kings took the trophy home. Multan Sultans, who won their first title defeating Peshawar Zalmi on 24 June 2021 in Abu Dhabi. Lahore Qalandars won their first title on 27 February 2022, against reigning champions Multan Sultan. Lahore Qalandars again defeated Multan Sultans with a minor margin of 1 run to win their consecutive 2nd title of the tournament in its 8th edition on 18 March 2023.

Season results

Team results

 Notes
 : Winner;
 : Runner-up;
 PO: Eliminated in the play-off stage
 Grp: Eliminated in the group stage

Trophy
On 19 February 2020, the previous version of trophy for the league was unveiled by squash player Jahangir Khan alongside then PCB chairman Ehsan Mani at National Stadium, Karachi. The 65 centimetre long trophy weighing eight kilograms has a crescent and star with multi colored strips of enamel and was used in all events from the 2020 PSL to the 2022 PSL, with every year's winning team name engraved on it.

The current version of the trophy, named Supernova, was unveiled on 9 February 2023. This trophy will be used for the 2023 edition of PSL. The trophy was entirely made in Pakistan by Lahore-based Mahfooz Jewellers.

Individual awards
The Hanif Mohammad award and a green cap are awarded to the leading run-scorer. It is an ongoing competition with the leading run-scorer wearing the cap throughout the tournament until the final game, with the eventual winner keeping the cap and receiving the award for the season. The Fazal Mahmood award and a maroon cap are awarded to the leading wicket-taker in the same way whilst the Imtiaz Ahmed award is awarded to the best wicket-keeper. All three awards were introduced in the second PSL season.

Sponsorship
The PSL's initial title sponsorship was awarded to HBL Pakistan for 3 years in December 2015. Sponsorship deals associated with the league including the title sponsorship, are estimated to be worth more than $6 million. HBL later renewed their sponsorship for three more years. In 2021, PCB announced that HBL retained the title sponsorship of the PSL for 4 more years till 2025.

Broadcasters 

For the first three seasons (2016–2018) of the league, Sunset and Vine were awarded production rights as official producers, and PTV Sports HD, Ten Sports HD and Geo Super HD were awarded broadcast rights in Pakistan with the PCB selling the global television rights to Tech Front, a UAE group. 4th, 5th and 6th seasons of the league was broadcast on PTV Sports HD and Geo Super HD in Pakistan. PSL sold its global television rights to Blitz Advertising for (2019–2021) period. It is believed to be closed to $36 million, a 358% increase from its previous deal. For the next three seasons (2019–2021) the production rights were sold to TransGroup International. PSL local TV broadcast rights saw an increase of 50% for 2022–2023 period. The PSL signed a two-year broadcast deal worth US$24 million for the 7th and 8th season of the league with local sports channels PTV Sports HD and A Sports HD. Later, Ten Sports HD also acquired the rights to broadcast. For the next four seasons (2022–2025) PSL sold the production rights to TransGroup International as official global Broadcaster.

List of broadcasters

Other media

Hamaray Heroes 

The HBL PSL Hamaray Heroes campaign was introduced in the HBL PSL 2020 and received an overwhelming response as the initiative rewarded prominent Pakistanis like squash player Farhan Mehboob, founder of ACF Animal Rescue Ayesha Chundrigar, mountaineer Ali Sadpara and professional eSports player Arslan Ash. A total of 32 HBL PSL Hamaray Heroes Awards were handed out during the HBL PSL 2020. The HBL PSL 2021, like the previous year, continued recognizing Pakistanis for their achievements till the PCB has postponed the remainder of its premier T20 events aimed the global COVID-19 pandemic. Acclaimed Pakistanis rewarded during HBL PSL 2021 under the banner of  HBL PSL Hamaray Heroes were footballer Kaleemullah Khan, security researcher Rafay Baloch, karate player Kulsoom Hazara, and mountaineer Mirza Ali Baig among others.

Cancer awareness 
Since 2019, the league observes a day for breast cancer awareness with pink ribbon theme and a day for childhood cancer awareness with golden ribbon theme.

See also

 List of Pakistan Super League records and statistics
 List of Pakistan Super League cricketers
 List of Pakistan Super League centuries
 List of Pakistan Super League anthems
 Kashmir Premier League
 HBL PSL Hamaray Heroes Award by Pakistan Super League
 Cricket in Pakistan
 Pakistan Junior League
 Sports in Pakistan

References

External links

 Official Website of PSL
 Tournament home at ESPNcricinfo

 
Twenty20 cricket leagues
Cricket leagues in Pakistan
Professional cricket leagues
Professional sports leagues in Pakistan
Sports leagues established in 2016
2016 establishments in Pakistan
Organisations based in Lahore